Newberry Crossroads, also known as Bid, is an unincorporated community in Cherokee County, Alabama, United States.

History
The community was named after two men named Newberry, one of whom owned a gin, and the other a store. A post office operated under the name Bid from 1894 to 1904.

References

Unincorporated communities in Cherokee County, Alabama
Unincorporated communities in Alabama